The Light in the Piazza is a 1960 novella by writer Elizabeth Spencer.

At its core are Margaret Johnson and her daughter Clara, who are on vacation in Italy, where Clara becomes enamored of local Florentine Fabrizio. What appears on the surface to be nothing more than a romantic story of young love slowly dissolves into a more tragic tale involving a past accident with serious consequences, dark family secrets, deception, and a conflict between maternal love and responsibility and an innocent girl's physical and emotional desires as she becomes aware of her awakening sexuality. A secondary plot resembles a comedy of manners as it examines the national differences between Americans and Italians, both represented in a somewhat stereotypical fashion.

Adaptations

Screenwriter Julius J. Epstein adapted Spencer's book for a 1962 film, directed by Guy Green. The cast included Olivia de Havilland, Yvette Mimieux, Rossano Brazzi, and George Hamilton, who was nominated for a BAFTA Award for his performance.

In 2003, the book inspired a musical adaptation, written by Craig Lucas and composed by Adam Guettel.

References

External links
 
 

1960 American novels
American novels adapted into films
American novels adapted into plays
Novels set in Florence
Disability in fiction